Pentafluranol (INN, BAN) (developmental code name BX-430) is a synthetic, nonsteroidal estrogen of the stilbestrol group related to diethylstilbestrol that was developed for the treatment of benign prostatic hyperplasia never marketed. It was described in the medical literature in 1974.

See also
 Acefluranol
 Bifluranol
 Terfluranol

References

Organofluorides
Phenols
Synthetic estrogens
Fluoroarenes
Trifluoromethyl compounds